Edwin Cole may refer to:

 Edwin Louis Cole (1922–2002), founder of the Christian Men's Network
 Edwin Cole (RAF officer) (1895–?), World War I flying ace
 Buddy Cole (musician) (Edwin LeMar Cole, 1916–1964), jazz pianist and orchestra leader